Jana Nikolovska (born 12 September 1979) is a Macedonian alpine skier. She competed in the women's giant slalom at the 1998 Winter Olympics.

References

1979 births
Living people
Macedonian female alpine skiers
Olympic alpine skiers of North Macedonia
Alpine skiers at the 1998 Winter Olympics
Sportspeople from Skopje